HD 10307 (HR 483) is a spectroscopic binary star in the constellation Andromeda. The primary is similar to the Sun in mass, temperature and metal content. situated about 42 light-years from Earth Its companion, HR 483 B, is a little-studied red dwarf.
 
HD 10307 was identified in September 2003 by astrobiologist Margaret Turnbull from the University of Arizona in Tucson as one of the most promising nearby candidates for hosting life based on her analysis of the HabCat list of stars.

System 

HR 483 is a binary located 42.6 ly away, in Andromeda. The two stars orbit one another elliptically (e=0.44), approaching as close as 4.2 AU and receding to 10.5 AU, with a period of just under twenty years.

HD 10307 A, the larger component, is a G-type main-sequence star similar to the Sun, only slightly brighter, hotter, larger, and older than the Sun—though with a slightly smaller mass. It has a low level of activity and is a candidate Maunder minimum analog. HR 483 B, the smaller component, appears to be a red dwarf, with as little as thirty-eight percent the mass of the sun. A debris disk has been detected in this system.

The presence of a moderately close companion could disrupt the orbit of a hypothetical planet in HD 10307's habitable zone. However, the uncertainty of the orbital parameters makes it equally uncertain exactly where stable orbits would be in this system.

METI message to HD 10307
There was a METI message sent to HD 10307. It was transmitted from Eurasia's largest radar, 70-meter Eupatoria Planetary Radar. The message was named Cosmic Call 2, it was sent on July 6, 2003, and it will arrive at HD 10307 in September 2044.

References

External links 
 High proper-motion Star
 Image HD 10307
 Space.com: Top 10 List of Habitable Stars to Guide Search
 Spectra HD 10307

G-type main-sequence stars
M-type main-sequence stars
Solar analogs
Maunder Minimum
Spectroscopic binaries

Andromeda (constellation)
Durchmusterung objects
010307
0067
007918
0483